The Plain brush-tailed rat (Isothrix pagurus) is a spiny rat species found in Brazil.

References

Isothrix
Mammals described in 1845